Nicolas Carnot may refer to:

 Lazare Nicolas Marguerite Carnot (1753–1823), French statesman and mathematician 
 Nicolas Léonard Sadi Carnot (1796–1832), French physicist, son of above